Josefa "Pepa" Rus (born 6 October 1985) is a Spanish actress, humorist, and singer known for having played the role of Inmaculada "Macu" Colmenero on the TV series Aída.

Biography
In mid–2007, Pepa Rus joined the secondary cast of the series Aída, playing the role of Mauricio's young niece Inmaculada "Macu" Colmenero, in her television debut. Regarding this, Rus commented: "It came to me by surprise. I found out on the bus when I was going to Seville to see my family. I dedicated myself to see all the chapters of 7 vidas and the first seasons of Aida."

Subsequently, from 2008 until the end of the series in 2010, she starred in the role of Berta, a girl recently arrived in the city, in the series . In 2010, she made her film debut, playing Pepi in the film , where she shared the screen with Mario Casas, María Valverde, and Secun de la Rosa.

In 2015, she joined the series , where she played Secundina "Secun" Garcia, a complaining neighbor who lives above the gym and who continually threatens Tony with reporting him. In 2017 she again played Secundina García in the spin-off .

Acting roles

Film

Television

Guest appearances

Theater

Discography

Singles
 2011: "Lore, Lore, Macu, Macu"

References

1985 births
21st-century Spanish actresses
21st-century Spanish singers
Actresses from Andalusia
Singers from Andalusia
Living people
People from Chiclana de la Frontera
Spanish film actresses
Spanish humorists
Spanish stage actresses
Spanish television actresses
Women humorists